Eek Airport  is a state-owned public-use airport serving the city of Eek in the Bethel Census Area of the U.S. state of Alaska.

As per Federal Aviation Administration records, this airport had 3,759 passenger boardings (enplanements) in calendar year 2007, an increase of 16% from the 3,241 enplanements in 2006.

Facilities 
Eek Airport has one runway designated 17/35 with a 3,243 x 60 ft (988 x 18 m) gravel surface.

A federally funded project relocated the airport to a new location about two miles west of Eek. The former airport had a 1,400 by 35 ft runway and was located east of Eek at coordinates .

Airlines and destinations

Prior to its bankruptcy and cessation of all operations, Ravn Alaska served the airport from multiple locations.

Statistics

References

External links 
 Resources for this airport:
 
 
 

Airports in the Bethel Census Area, Alaska